The IFBB Wings of Strength Rising Phoenix World Championships is a professional female bodybuilding competition, sponsored by Wings of Strength company founded by Jake and Kristal Wood., promoted by Tim Gardner Productions, and sanctioned by the International Federation of BodyBuilders (I.F.B.B.). It was the most prestigious IFBB professional female bodybuilding event around from 2015 to 2019, while the Ms. Olympia contest was on hiatus. The first championship show took place in conjunction with the IFBB Texas Pro, the NPC Tim Gardner Texas Extravaganza, and the NPC National on August 22, 2015 at the Grand Hyatt, San Antonio, Texas.

History
On March 8, 2015, Wings of Strength announced the creation of the Rising Phoenix World Championships. Regarded as the successor to the Ms. Olympia, Rising Phoenix World Championships adopted the point qualification system that the Ms. Olympia had.

Champions

Chronologically

Number of wins

Number of consecutive wins

Top 3 (Ms. Rising Phoenix)

Medals by nation (Ms. Rising Phoenix)

Top 3 (Best poser award)

Medals by nation (Best poser award)

Medals by nation (Most muscular award)

Top 3 (Best intro video award)

Medals by nation (Best intro video award)

Qualification

See also
 Ms. Olympia
 Ms. International

References

External links
Wings of Strength Rising Phoenix World Championships homepage

2015 establishments in Texas
Female professional bodybuilding competitions
Recurring sporting events established in 2015